Zvonimir Rogoz (10 October 1887 – 6 February 1988) was a Croatian actor who played in German, Croatian, Slovenian, Czech and Slovakian, on stage and in cinema, during a career long 81 years.

A native of Zagreb, Rogoz started his actor's career in Vienna in Wiener Theater. From 1919 to 1929 he was actor and director in Ljubljana. Rogoz became famous in Czechoslovakia as a guest in title roles when Ljubljana theater in 1927 played in Prague Shakespeare's Hamlet and Dostoevsky's Idiot. Rogoz remained in engagement in National Theatre in Prague from 1929 till 1949. In the prewar period he appeared in many Czechoslovak films of the 1930s, including the 1933 erotic drama Ecstasy, featuring young Hedy Lamarr. He then returned to Zagreb, playing in theater, cinema and television till his death. Younger generations of Croatia remember him even more for his private life: he fathered a child at the age of 92. This and other events became the subject of his autobiographical book Mojih prvih 100 godina (My First 100 Years). He died in Zagreb a few months after his 100th birthday.

Filmography
 The Glembays (1988)
 Pet mrtvih adresa (1984)
 Kiklop (1982)
 Dobro jutro sine (1978)
 Okupacija u 26 slika (1978)
 Harmonika (1972)
 Putovanje na mjesto nesreće (1971)
 Starci (1971)
 Slučajni život (1969)
 Cintek (1967)
 Rondo (1966)
 Ključ (1965)
 Banket (1965)
 San (1965)
 Doktor Knok (1964)
 Vrapčić (1964)
 Carevo novo ruho (1961)
 Samsonov sin (1960)
 Vlak bez voznog reda (1959)
 Nije bilo uzalud (1957)
 Opsada (1956)
 The Beginning Was Sin (1954)
 U početku bijaše grijeh (1954)
 Koncert kao Pjaskovski (1954)
 Revolucijski rok 1848 (1949)
 Pripad Z-8 (1949)
 Muzikant (1948)
 Dok se vratiš (1948)
 Tri kamaradi (1947)
 Violina i san (1947)
 Krakatit (1947)
 Fourteen at the Table (1943)
 Bila jahta u Splitu (1939)
 Ecstasy (1933)

TV roles
 Dnevnik Očenašeka (1968)

External links
 

1887 births
1988 deaths
20th-century Croatian male actors
Croatian centenarians
Male actors from Zagreb
Croatian male film actors
Croatian male silent film actors
Croatian male television actors
Men centenarians
Burials at Mirogoj Cemetery